Love for the Arts is an American international competition series created, produced and hosted by Trinity the Tuck. The show documents Trinity's search for the best drag artist. The show is all inclusive and recruits drag contestants from all drag backgrounds. Each week, contestants are given different challenges and runways while Trinity and guest judges critique contestants' progress throughout the competition.

History 
In 2019, Trinity started Love For The Arts as a traveling competition in cities all over the US to uplift all types of drag artists who did not have a platform. In 2020, Trinity decided to create a digital version for a reality competition which is loosely based on the original Love For The Arts tour. The new digital version is more advanced in structure and concept to create a more dynamic competition setting.

Format 
Each episode opens with Trinity introducing herself. She then reveals the fan voting poll results for who is eliminated based on the previous episode's lip sync battle. Trinity then introduces the week's guest judge(es) and proceeds to show the episode challenge.

Challenges 
Each episode features a main challenge where each of the competitors must either act, design and create a look, or do a presentation. The performances are generally judged right after. Trinity then presents the runway.

Runways 
If the challenge involves the creation of an outfit, that outfit is presented to the judges in the runway. Otherwise, a theme is assigned and the contestants must put together a look that fits the theme, which is presented to the judges. The runway looks and presentation are judged along with challenge performance.

Lip Sync Battles 
The contestants selected as the bottom two must lip sync to songs previously filmed by each contestant. After the lip sync battle, Trinity opens a poll online where fans vote on who should stay in the competition. The results are then shown in the following episode.

Judges 
Trinity the Tuck serves as the primary judge on the show, and is the only regular judge on the panel. Each episode she is joined by a rotating cast of celebrity models, makeup artists and drag alumni including Alaska, Adore Delano, Bitqtch Puddin, Landon Cider, Trinity K. Bonet, Peppermint, Manila Luzon, Shea Coulee and Vander Von Odd.

Series overview

Season 1 (2020)

Overview 

Season 1 of Love For The Arts was officially announced via Trinity the Tuck's Instagram on July 26, 2020. The show first aired on August 4, 2020 on her Twitch channel. The performers went through an audition process in which a certain group of performers then were put through to the semi-final in which the public would vote the 10 performers to enter the competition. Originally 10 performers were cast as shown in the promo but Spikey Van Dykey was announced to have quit the show at the start of Episode 1 due to personal reasons. The performers compete to win custom costumes from Jeffrey Kelly Designs & Sew-excited, a "one of a kind hairstyle" from Shontelle Sparkles, custom accessories by Kalaqtic, a new brand logo by Dan Polyak, a complete make-up package from BatMe Cosmetics, a "one of a kind" custom crown by Fierce Drag Jewels and a cash prize of $5000 provided by Twitch.

The winner of the first season of Love For The Arts was Gvajardo from Monterrey, Mexico with Carmen Monoxide and Lesley Wolf being the runners-up.

Contestants

Contestant Progress

 The contestant won Love For The Arts
 The contestant was a runner-up
  The contestant won the Class Clown award for best personality.
 The contestant received positive critiques, and was declared safe.
 The contestant received critiques and was ultimately declared safe.
 The contestant received negative critiques but was ultimately declared safe.
  The contestant was in the bottom and faced the public vote.
  The contestant was in the bottom but did not face the public vote due to another contestant quitting.
  The contestant was eliminated.
  The contestant returned to the competition and was eliminated in the same episode.
  The contestant quit the competition.

Episodes

References 

2010s American LGBT-related television series
2010s Canadian LGBT-related television series
2010s Canadian reality television series
2010s LGBT-related reality television series
2020s American LGBT-related television series
2020s Canadian LGBT-related television series
American LGBT-related web series
Canadian LGBT-related web series
Drag (clothing) television shows
OutTV (Canadian TV channel) original programming
Television series by World of Wonder (company)
Canadian LGBT-related reality television series
American LGBT-related reality television series
Reality competition television series